Trichocorixa louisianae is a species of water boatman in the family Corixidae. It is found in the Caribbean Sea, Central America, and North America.

References

Articles created by Qbugbot
Insects described in 1931
Corixini